is an erotic dating sim visual novel. It is the first game in the Dōkyūsei series of adult-themed dating sims by ELF Corporation.  It was released in 1992, with a heavily altered Windows version released in 1999.

A remake (based on the Windows version) was announced in October 2020 and released on February 26, 2021 in Japan. English and Chinese localisations of the remake have been released in on Steam in 2022 as Dōkyūsei: Bangin’ Summer; they were planned to come out on March 11, 2022 but were delayed to April 14 to pass a review by the platform.

Game system
The gameplay in Dōkyūsei revolves around wandering through different locations in a town, conversing with whatever character the player happens to meet. To finish the storyline of a particular girl, the main challenge is to learn the times of day when the girl will be in a location.

OVA
There was an OVA series made from Dōkyūsei, which was originally a 45-minute one-shot, but the original release was expanded into two half-hour episodes, with two more episodes added, for a total four. The first two episodes were released as End of Summer, and episodes three and four were released as End of Summer 2 in the North American market by SoftCel Pictures, an imprint of ADV Films.  A two-episode sequel, titled Dōkyūsei Climax Files, was also released.

End of Summer is about a boy who seeks after a redheaded girl named Mai and along the way runs into difficulties (and trysts) with several other girls, namely, Kurumi, Miho, Misa, and Satomi. It was renowned for its romantic attributes and quality of animation. The depth of character development has been reviewed as being above average, although the format forced on it by OVA requires some compromises with realism. 

A new OVA, Doukyuusei Remake The Animation, was released in 2022.

Music 
The OVAs use some classical music, including:

References

External links

 
 
 
 

1992 video games
1994 anime OVAs
DOS games
Bishōjo games
Bunjūrō Nakayama
ELF Corporation games
Eroge
FM Towns games
Hentai anime and manga
Japan-exclusive video games
NEC PC-9801 games
PC-FX games
Pink Pineapple
TurboGrafx-CD games
PlayStation (console) games
Sega Saturn games
X68000 games
Video games developed in Japan
Video games scored by Noriyuki Iwadare
Visual novels
Windows games